This is a list of airlines currently operating in Bulgaria.

Scheduled airlines

Charter airlines

Cargo airlines

See also
 List of airlines
 List of defunct airlines of Bulgaria
 List of defunct airlines of Europe

References

 
Bulgaria
Airlines
Airlines
Bulgaria